In April 2018, the Dutch Government approved a multi-year investment program for the Dutch Navy and allocated funds for the 2018–2030 period. The Dutch Defence Materiel Administration (DMO) is in charge of the procurement of these new ships.

Ships under construction
The following is a list of vessels currently under construction for the Royal Netherlands Navy:

Surface combatants

De Zeven Provinciën-class frigate
Upgrading the De Zeven Provinciën-class LCF frigates Theatre Ballistic Missile Defense, acquisition of SM-3 missiles, a new OtoMelara 127/64 LW canon, ESSM-2 and SLCM integration 2018–2021.

Replacement

In 2020 it was announced that these intensively used ships will not be replaced as planned around 2025.

Karel Doorman-class frigates

Replacement

The two multipurpose M-frigates which are still in service with the Royal Netherlands Navy are reaching the end of their life; they were designed to last until 2018/2023. Because of this the Dutch Ministry of Defence started design studies in 2013. The new frigates are again planned to fulfill a general purpose role with anti-submarine warfare as its specialty. However, since the Netherlands Royal Navy only owns six frigates in total by 2017, the new ships have to be able to perform well in all areas of the spectrum. This means that anti-air equipment also has to be present, in the form of VLS (vertical launch)-cells carrying Standard Missile 2 or ESSM-projectiles. Due to budget cuts, the replacement program was delayed and is now projected to deliver the first ships in 2028–29.

Holland-class OPV

Replacement
In the 2022 Defense spending bill it was announced that at the end of their life cycle the four ships of the Holland-class will be replaced together with the two ships of the Rotterdam-class to form a new class of 'cross-over' ships with patrol-, amphibious- & emergency relief capabilities in mind.

TRIFIC-program

On 23 November 2022 it was revealed that the navy is investigating the possibility of purchasing four commercially available offshore supply type vessels and use these ships as missile carriers. This program was dubbed The Rapidly Increased Firepower Capability Royal Netherlands Navy (TRIFIC) and would become a low-manned ships, with the eventual goal of having a fully autonomous vessel. The TRIFIC-vessels can carry up to six container units with eight or more missiles (depending on missile size). One or more of these ships would accompany another vessel like a frigate or an OPV and use the guiding systems and radars of these ships to attack targets.

Amphibious warfare

Rotterdam-class LPDs
With the midlife update of Johan de Witt planned to take place in 2021–2022. Amongst other things the radars will be updated, with Thales NS100 radar & Thales Scout Mk3 replacing the Thales Variant radar & Kelvin Hughes radar.
 HNLMS Rotterdam is set to be replaced by 2030.
 HNLMS Johan de Witt is set to be replaced by 2032.

Replacement
In the 2022 Defense spending bill it was announced that at the end of their life cycle the two Rotterdam-class ships will be replaced together with the four ships of the Holland-class to form a new class of 'cross-over' ships with patrol-, amphibious- & emergency relief capabilities in mind.

LCU's
Acquisition of new LCUs in 2025 with additional capacity to support amphibious operations and the integration of the German Navy Marines (Seebatallion).

Mine countermeasures vessel

Alkmaar-class MCM ships
The Netherlands and Belgium are doing a joint procurement for the replacements of the Alkmaar-class MCM ships. Both countries want to procure six new mine countermeasure (MCM) vessels, which makes for a total of 12 MCM ships. The new MCM ships will include a range of unmanned systems including unmanned surface, aerial and underwater vehicles alongside towed sonars and mine identification and neutralization ROVs.

Contenders
 The Franco-Belgium consortium made up of French shipbuilders STX France and Socarenam together with Belgium's EDR are bidding for the 12 new MCM vessels. Their plan includes the construction of MCM vessels named Sea Naval Solutions and a multi-role frigate named Deviceseas, which will serve as mothership to the MCM vessels. All ships will have a strong focus on autonomous systems operations.
 France's Naval Group and  established Belgian subsidiary Naval & Robotics and bid for the program.
 Imtech Belgium and Damen Group bid for the program.

Selection

The contract was won by Naval Group on 15 March 2019. Delivery of the first ship to the Royal Netherlands Navy is anticipated in 2025.

Ships
The names for the six ships were announced during the keel laying ceremony for the first in class ship, .

Submarines

Walrus-class submarines

In November 2014, the Dutch Minister of Defence announced plans to replace the s in 2025.

In April 2022 it was announced that the revised schedule for construction of the new replacement boats would likely see the first two vessels entering service in the 2034 to 2037 timeframe.

On 16 November 2022 the next phase in the program was started when DMO delivered the request for quotation to the three remaining yards. It is expected that the proposals will come in during the summer of 2023 with a final decision being made by the navy in late 2023 or early 2024.

Contenders
The Ministry of Defence has shortlisted three bidders:

 Damen Group and Saab Group announced that they have partnered from 2015 to jointly develop, offer and build next-generation submarines that are able to replace the current Walrus-class submarines. It was announced on 1 June 2018 that their design will be derived from the A26 submarine. The boat's armament includes 6 torpedo tubes and 1 multi-mission lock which can be used to deploy special forces.

 Naval Group announced that it is offering its newest submarine class, the Barracuda class, as replacement for the Walrus class. A version of the "Shortfin" diesel-electric variant Barracuda class was be offered, rather than the nuclear variant used by the French Navy.

 ThyssenKrupp Marine Systems is planning to offer a Type 212CD submarine.

Failed bids
Spain's Navantia's S-80 was not accepted as a contender following the B-letter in 2019. In 2022 the Spanish Ministry of Defence send a letter to the DMO for Navantia to be allowed to put in an offer following a RfQ sent to the remaining contenders, in which some of the requirements have changed. It is rumoured that the request was denied by DMO.

Auxiliary ships

Den Helder-class replenishment ship

 is a new replenishment oiler currently under construction. Also known as the Combat Support Ship (CSS), Den Helder is planned to fill the gap of replenishment at sea that was left after  was sold to Peru in 2014.

The first steel was cut in a ceremony on December 2, 2020, at the Damen yard in Galati. On 2 June Damen Shipyards Galati has performed the keel-laying ceremony. The keel-laying ceremony was performed by the Director of the DMO, vice admiral Arie Jan de Waard and vice admiral Rob Kramer, Commander Royal Netherlands Navy (RNLN). The ship was formally laid down on 2 June 2021.
The assembled ship was moved to a deeper part of the drydock in October 2022 with work expected to continue through 2023. Sea trials are anticipated in early 2024.

Minor vessels

On 16 June 2022 it was announced in the B-letter that these ten vessels will be replaced by eight new ships of the same family. Four will be ocean going and the other four are for coastal or inland duties. These ships will be built by a Dutch shipyard which will be selected in 2024.

Ocean going
The sea going variant will replace the five larger vessels:

Coastal
The coastal variant will replace the five smaller vessels:

Tugboats

Schelde-class

The navy is planning on replacing the five  with three new line handling work boats. They are build by Stormer Marine in Hoorn and should be delivered in 2023 and 2024.

See also
 List of active Royal Netherlands Navy ships
 Future of the Royal Navy
 Future of the Royal Australian Navy
 Future of the Indian Navy
 Future of the Russian Navy
 Future of the United States Navy

External links
 Defence procurement in Dutch

Citations

Royal Netherlands Navy
Military acquisition
Military planning